Red Square, officially Central Plaza, is a large open square on the Seattle campus of the University of Washington that serves as a hub for two of the university's major axes, connecting the campus's northern Liberal Arts Quadrangle ("The Quad") with the science and engineering buildings found on the lower campus. The plaza is paved with red brick, and becomes notoriously slippery during rain.

During the 1909 Alaska–Yukon–Pacific Exposition, the square was the site for the temporary U.S. Government Building. After the exposition closed, the building was removed and the area left an open field that eventually became known as the Suzzallo Quadrangle, after Suzzallo Library, which stood at its eastern edge.

In 1969, the field was excavated, an underground parking garage was built, and the engineers who designed the garage thought that the rain on the grass would leak into the garage, leading to the choice of a distinctive red brick surface. Cassandra Amesely, then an editor of the student paper The Daily, convinced the student population to refer to the area as Red Square, presumably in reference to the color of the brick. Whether it was also meant to refer to Moscow's Red Square in an era known for student activism is unclear.

The northwest area of the square is dominated by three brick monoliths, one of which was built to ventilate the underground garage, the other two being erected for aesthetic reasons. The northeast corner of the square features a version of Barnett Newman's Broken Obelisk sculpture.

The plaza is surrounded by the following buildings:
 Suzzallo Library to the east: the university's central library
 Gerberding Hall to the southeast: university administration
 Meany Hall to the southwest: performing arts facilities
 Odegaard Undergraduate Library to the northwest
 Kane Hall to the northeast: lecture halls

References

External links
A shot of Red Square, refreshed every five minutes, from a camera atop Kane Hall
A similar view, this one a video still, refreshed every minute.

Squares in Seattle
University of Washington campus